The 1973 WCT World Doubles was a tennis tournament played on indoor carpet courts in Montreal in Canada that was part of the 1973 World Championship Tennis circuit. It was the tour finals for the doubles season of the WCT Tour. The tournament was held from May 3 through May 7, 1973.

Final

Doubles

 Robert Lutz /  Stan Smith defeated  Tom Okker /  Marty Riessen 6–2, 7–6(7–1), 6–0

Masters Doubles WCT
World Championship Tennis World Doubles
1973 in Canadian tennis